The 2016 FC Okzhetpes season is the club's second season back in the Kazakhstan Premier League, the highest tier of association football in Kazakhstan, and 20th in total. Okzhetpes will also take part in the Kazakhstan Cup.

Squad

Transfers

Winter

In:

Out:

Summer

In:

Out:

Friendlies

Competitions

Kazakhstan Premier League

Regular season

Results summary

Results by round

Results

League table

Championship round

Results summary

Results by round

Results

League table

Kazakhstan Cup

Squad statistics

Appearances and goals

|-
|colspan="14"|Players away from Okzhetpes on loan:
|-
|colspan="14"|Players who appeared for Okzhetpes that left during the season:

|}

Goal scorers

Disciplinary record

References

External links
Official Website

FC Okzhetpes seasons
Okzhetpes